Adumo is a town in Chimbu Province, in the Highlands Region of Papua New Guinea.

Populated places in Chimbu Province